The 2020 Chernobyl Exclusion Zone wildfires were a series of wildfires that began burning inside Ukraine's Chernobyl Exclusion Zone in April 2020. The fires were largely extinguished within two weeks. At least one suspect was arrested for alleged arson.

Timeline 
On April 6, it was reported that radiation levels inside the zone were "16 times above normal" as a result of the fires. As the fire spread, a small village near the mostly abandoned town of Poliske was evacuated on April 10. More than 300 firefighters worked to stop the fires from reaching the plant. By 11 April, the firefighters had reached close to 400, with many helicopters and 100 fire engines dispersed to the Chernobyl exclusion zone. The State Emergency Service of Ukraine said it was still fighting the fires, but that the situation was under control, while Greenpeace Russia said the situation was "much worse than Ukrainian authorities believe", citing satellite images. On 14 April, the State Emergency Service of Ukraine said all large fires inside the Exclusion Zone had been extinguished after ten days of firefighting efforts and recent rainfall in the region. According to Euro News, 124 firefighters were reported to have engaged the larger fire in Kotovsky Forest close to the village of Volodymyrivka.

Suspect
A 27-year-old local resident was arrested for arson. It is unclear if the man, who has confessed to starting fires "for fun", is partly or fully responsible for the wildfires. The suspect told the authorities that he had set fire to dry grass close to the forest, without making an attempt to put out the fire as it started spreading. Fines for arson have been raised, after a vote by the parliament on 13 April.

Damage
It was reported by a Forbes.com contributor that 30% of the tourist attractions in the exclusion zone had been destroyed, including the Soviet-era pioneer camp Izumrudnoe. The damage included several abandoned villages such as "Stara Markivka" surrounding Chernobyl that burnt down completely. Fire damage was also reported in the surrounding Red Forest where numerous trees were "swiftly" killed. The power plant itself, and the cities of Chernobyl and Pripyat survived "unscathed". President Volodymyr Zelensky disclosed on 26 April that the fires had ravaged about 11.5 thousand hectares.

Environmental consequences 
The wildfires caused a thick haze to blanket the capital Kyiv, making its air pollution among the worst in the world, comparable with that of some Chinese cities. IQAir reported that at one point on April 16, Kyiv had the worst air pollution in the world. However, the smog has had little impact on the health of residents as it coincided with a lockdown due to the COVID-19 pandemic in Ukraine, which meant most people were indoors. On 17 April, despite the increase in radiation levels the United Nations atomic agency stated that the power plant does not pose a danger to human health, considering the reports issued by Ukraine. They also added that the concentration of radioactive materials in the air had stayed under the safety norms of Ukraine’s radiation, as discovered by the State Nuclear Regulatory Inspectorate of Ukraine.

References 

2020 Chernobyl Exclusion Zone
2020 wildfires
2020 in Ukraine
April 2020 events in Ukraine
Environmental disasters in Ukraine
Fires in Ukraine
Arson in Europe
2020 disasters in Ukraine
2020 fires in Europe